The 1922 Wyoming gubernatorial election took place on November 7, 1922. Incumbent Republican Governor Robert D. Carey ran for re-election, but was narrowly defeated for renomination by banker John W. Hay. In the Democratic primary, William B. Ross, a 1918 candidate for Governor and the former Laramie County Attorney, defeated former State Representative George Kindler and Frank McDowell. The contest between Ross and Hay was close, with Ross narrowly beating out Hay, 51% to 49%, with a margin of just 723 votes. However, Ross would not end up serving a full term as Governor; he died in October 1924 and was eventually succeeded by his wife, Nellie Tayloe Ross.

Democratic Primary

Candidates
 William B. Ross, attorney, 1910 Democratic nominee for Congress, former Laramie County Attorney
 George E. Kindler, former State Representative from Park County
 Frank McDowell

Results

Republican Primary

Candidates
 John W. Hay, banker
 Robert D. Carey, incumbent Governor

Results

Results

References

1922 Wyoming elections
1922
Wyoming